Ashburnham is a town in Worcester County, Massachusetts, United States. At the 2020 census, the town population was 6,315. It is home to Cushing Academy, a private preparatory boarding school.

Ashburnham contains the census-designated place of South Ashburnham.

History

Ashburnham was first settled by Europeans in 1736, and was officially incorporated in 1765. The name is of British origin, possibly drawn from the Earl of Ashburnham, in Pembrey, or the Sussex community of Ashburnham.

Ashburnham was originally made up of the lands granted to officers and soldiers of a 1690 expedition to Canada. It was called the Plantation of Dorchester-Canada until it was incorporated.

Geography
Ashburnham has two distinct topographical areas, hilly to the east and relatively flat high ground to the west. To the east, Mount Watatic and Little Watatic Mountain rise in the northeastern part of town, with Jewell Hill to the southeast and Blood Hill rising just over the town line. In the western part of town are several lakes, including Lake Wampanoag, Sunset Lake, Lake Watatic, Wallace Pond, and the Upper & Lower Naukeag Lakes, all of which (except Lake Wampanoag) feed into the headwaters of the Millers River, which flows westward towards the Connecticut River. Several brooks also feed into these lakes and ponds, along with several others between the hills in the eastern part of town. Several areas scattered around the town are protected as part of Ashburnham State Forest, as well as two smaller areas which are parts of Mount Watatic State Wildlife Management Area and a small portion of the High Ridge Wildlife Management Area to the south.

Though it is over fifteen miles west of the easternmost portions of Worcester County, it nonetheless is the northeast corner of the county, bordering Middlesex County to the east, and Cheshire County, New Hampshire and Hillsborough County, New Hampshire to the north. Ashburnham is bordered by Rindge, New Hampshire and New Ipswich, New Hampshire to the north, Ashby to the east, Westminster and a small portion of Fitchburg to the southeast, Gardner to the southwest, and Winchendon to the west. The town's center lies seven miles from downtown Fitchburg, 29 miles north of Worcester, and fifty miles northwest of Boston. There are several small villages within town, the most notable being North and South Ashburnham.

Transportation
There are no interstates or limited-access highways within the town of Ashburnham, with the nearest being Route 2, the major east-west route through northern Massachusetts, which passes through Fitchburg and Westminster. Route 12 passes from east to west through town, entering from Westminster and passing west towards Winchendon. The northern terminus of Route 101, which passes from Gardner towards the north before terminating at Route 119, which passes from Ashby before entering New Hampshire and becoming New Hampshire Route 119. Routes 12 &101 share a short, 150-yard concurrency in the center of town. There are no stoplights in town.

An abandoned section of the Springfield Terminal Railroad passes through the town, splitting in South Ashburnham, part of which returns towards Gardner, the other part heading through Winchendon towards New Hampshire. A line of the Montachusett Regional Transit Authority (MART) serves the town.  MART also operates fixed-route bus services, shuttle services, as well as paratransit services for Ashburnham and the Montachusett Region.

There are two general aviation airports nearby, Fitchburg Municipal Airport and Gardner Municipal Airport, with the nearest national air service being at Manchester-Boston Regional Airport in New Hampshire.

Demographics

As of the census of 2000, there were 5,546 people, 1,929 households, and 1,541 families residing in the town. The racial makeup of the town was 97.66% White, 0.22% African American, 0.04% Native American, 0.61% Asian, 0.31% from other races, and 1.17% from two or more races. Hispanic or Latino of any race were 1.66% of the population. 19.5% were of Irish, 15.9% French, 13.7% French Canadian, 9.4% Italian, 7.0% English, 6.6% Finnish and 5.6% American ancestry according to Census 2000.

There were 1,929 households, out of which 42.0% had children under the age of 18 living with them, 66.8% were married couples living together, 9.3% had a female householder with no husband present, and 20.1% were non-families. 15.6% of all households were made up of individuals, and 5.4% had someone living alone who was 65 years of age or older.  The average household size was 2.87 and the average family size was 3.20.

In the town, the age distribution of the population shows 29.0% under the age of 18, 6.7% from 18 to 24, 30.9% from 25 to 44, 24.5% from 45 to 64, and 8.9% who were 65 years of age or older.  The median age was 37 years. For every 100 females there were 103.2 males.  For every 100 females age 18 and over, there were 99.3 males.

According to the 2010 census, the median household income was $76,250 and the average household income was $81,324. The per capita household income was $29,044.  About 4.8% of families and 6.4% of the population were below the poverty line, including 6.8% of those under age 18 and 6.4% of those age 65 or over. The median house cost was $266,347.

Government

The Town is governed by a Board of Selectmen who are elected to three-year terms. As of January 2020, the Board is served by Rosemarie Meissner (Chair), John Mulhall (member), Leo Janssens (member), and Mary Calandrella (Executive Assistant to Town Administrator).

The Ashburnham & Winchendon Joint Water Authority provides municipal water. The water source is the spring-fed Upper Naukeag Lake in Ashburnham.

Education

Ashburnham is part of the Ashburnham-Westminster Regional High School district, along with neighboring Westminster. The town has one elementary school, the John R. Briggs Elementary School serving K–5. Middle school students attend Overlook Middle School, and high school students attend Oakmont Regional High School. There is one private school in the town: Cushing Academy.

Points of interest
 Ashburnham is the starting point for the Wapack Trail and Massachusetts Midstate Trail.
 Cambridge Grant Historic District
 Mount Watatic was named as one of the 1,000 places to visit in Massachusetts by the Great Places in Massachusetts Commission.
 Frederick historic piano collection
 Camp Winnekeag

Notable people

 Ivers Whitney Adams, founder and president of the Boston Red Stockings, Boston's first baseball team, as well as the Boston Base Ball Club, the first professional baseball franchise in Boston. He also gave to the town its own water supply as well as commissioned Bela Pratt to design the Schoolboy Statue of 1850, now on the corner of Main and School streets
 Melvin O. Adams, lawyer for Lizzie Borden, was born in Ashburnham
 Nate Berkus, designer and TV personality; graduated from Cushing Academy
 Bette Davis, legendary actress of film, television and theater. She lived in Ashburnham while attending Cushing Academy, graduating in 1927
 Isaac Hill (1788–1851), New Hampshire state representative, New Hampshire state senator, Comptroller of the United States Treasury in the Andrew Jackson administration, U.S. senator from New Hampshire, and governor of New Hampshire
 Harrison Carroll Hobart, Wisconsin politician
 Amos Pollard,  surgeon at The Battle of the Alamo
 Hans Rickheit, cartoonist, grew up in Ashburnham
 Cassius Clement Stearns (1838–1910), composer of church music
 Jigme Khesar Namgyal Wangchuck, King of the Kingdom of Bhutan; graduated from Cushing Academy

References

External links

 Town of Ashburnham official website
 John R. Briggs Elementary School 
 Overlook Middle School 

 
Towns in Massachusetts
Towns in Worcester County, Massachusetts
1765 establishments in Massachusetts
Populated places established in 1765